Djaffar Ahmed Said Hassani (born 20 February 1966) is Comorian politician from Grande Comore. Since 26 May 2016, he served as the Vice-President of the Comoros for Economy, Planning, Industry, Crafts, Investments, Private Sector and Land Affairs in the Comoros.

He opposed Azali Assoumani on the constitutional changes. In September 2018, an arrest warrant for him on charges of plotting against the state.

References

Comorian politicians
Living people
1966 births
Vice-presidents of the Comoros
People from Grande Comore